Armenia competed at the 2012 Winter Youth Olympics in Innsbruck, Austria. The Armenian team consisted of three athletes in two sports.

Biathlon

Armenia qualified one girl.

Girl

Cross country skiing

Armenia qualified a team of one boy and girl.

Boy

Girl

Sprint

See also
Armenia at the 2012 Summer Olympics

References

2012 in Armenian sport
Nations at the 2012 Winter Youth Olympics
Armenia at the Youth Olympics